Gilles Buck ( 1 March 1935 – 18 September 2010) was a French sailor who competed in the 1968 Summer Olympics.

References

External links
 

1935 births
2010 deaths
French male sailors (sport)
Olympic sailors of France
Sailors at the 1968 Summer Olympics – 5.5 Metre
Sportspeople from Troyes
20th-century French people